General Douglas MacArthur Military Academy was a military high school that was started by dissatisfied staff, faculty, and parents of Eastern Military Academy during the final years of that school's existence.  It was named for General Douglas MacArthur. The school existed from 1966 to 1975 and was located in Mount Freedom, New Jersey.

The school took over Lieberman's Royal House Hotel. The building was subsequently demolished. The site is vacant.

References

Defunct United States military academies
Randolph, New Jersey
Defunct schools in New Jersey
Demolished buildings and structures in New Jersey